Rudolf Holste (9 April 1897 – 4 December 1970) was a German general during World War II. He commanded the XLI Panzer Corps during the Battle of Berlin, allegedly abandoning his troops on 1 May 1945, one day before the city capitulated.

Career
Holste joined the German Army on in August 1914 and was commissioned as an officer in 1915. During World War II, he commanded 14th Infantry Division, the 4th Cavalry Division and the XLI Panzer Corps. On 15 November 1944 he was promoted to major general (Generalleutnant).

Battle of Berlin

On 22 April 1945, Holste became part of a poorly conceived and incredibly desperate plan that Field Marshal Wilhelm Keitel and Colonel General Alfred Jodl proposed to Adolf Hitler. The plan envisaged for the few remaining German forces in central Germany to attack the Soviet forces encircling Berlin. The plan called for General Walther Wenck's Twelfth Army on the Elbe and Mulde fronts to be turned around and to attack towards the east, then linking up just south of Berlin with General Theodor Busse's Ninth Army. Then both armies would strike in a northeastern direction towards Potsdam and Berlin. Wenck's objective would be the autobahn at Ferch, near Potsdam.

Holste's directive was to attack from the area northwest of Berlin with his XLI Panzer Corps across the Elbe between Spandau and Oranienburg. To give Holste as much punch as possible, Obergruppenführer Felix Steiner (who had been himself the subject of another desperate attempt by Hitler to save Berlin, a few days earlier) was to turn over to Holste his mechanized divisions (the 25th Panzer-Grenadiers and the 7th Panzer). Wenck's army did make a turn around and attacked towards Berlin, but was soon halted outside of Potsdam by strong Soviet resistance. Neither Busse nor Holste made much progress towards Berlin. By the end of the day on 27 April, the Soviet forces encircling Berlin linked up and the forces inside Berlin were cut off.

Late in the evening of 29 April, General Hans Krebs contacted Jodl by radio from Berlin and requested an immediate report on the whereabouts of Holste's spearhead. On 30 April, Jodl replied that Holste's Corps was on the defensive. Early on the morning of May 1, Holste is reported to have appeared at Twelfth Army HQ having abandoned his troops. A day later, on 2 May, the Battle for Berlin came to an end when General Helmuth Weidling unconditionally surrendered the city to the Soviets. Holste surrendered 8 May 1945. In 1947, he was released.

Awards
 Iron Cross (1914) 2nd Class (24 July 1915) & 1st Class (16 November 1917)
 Clasp to the Iron Cross 2nd Class (19 September 1939) & 1st Class (14 October 1939)
 German Cross in Gold on 24 December 1941 as Oberstleutnant in Artillerie-Regiment 73
 Knight's Cross of the Iron Cross with Oak Leaves
 Knight's Cross on 6 April 1942 as Oberst and commander of Artillerie-Regiment 73
 Oak Leaves on 27 August 1944 as Oberst and commander of 4. Kavallerie-Brigade

Citations

Bibliography

1897 births
1970 deaths
Battle of Berlin
German Army personnel of World War I
German prisoners of war in World War II
Lieutenant generals of the German Army (Wehrmacht)
People from Hesse-Nassau
People from Hameln-Pyrmont
Prussian Army personnel
Recipients of the clasp to the Iron Cross, 1st class
Recipients of the Gold German Cross
Recipients of the Knight's Cross of the Iron Cross with Oak Leaves
Military personnel from Lower Saxony